CNN Newsroom (also simply known as Newsroom) is an American news programming block that airs on CNN.

Broadcasting for 43 hours each week, Newsroom features live and taped news reports, in addition to analysis from experts on the issues being covered, and headlines throughout each hour. The program tends to focus on softer news than their hard news politics-based primetime lineup. The program is the standard "brand" for general rolling-news programming for the network, originating from their headquarters in Atlanta, Georgia. It debuted on September 4, 2006 replacing CNN Live Today, Live From, CNN Saturday, CNN Saturday Night, CNN Sunday, and CNN Sunday Night.

History 

CNN Newsroom features various anchors on weekdays and weekends. Since the start of September 8, 2008, the program has employed a single-presenter format.

The program shares the same name of an earlier CNN/U.S. program, debuted in 1989, that was shown commercial-free by teachers in schools.

On June 18, 2012, CNN introduced Around the World presented by Suzanne Malveaux. This hour-long block of news focuses on news across the globe. The show is based in CNN's World Headquarters in Atlanta. On February 25, 2013, Newsroom International was changed to Around the World, but was cancelled on February 7, 2014.

Weekend mornings, which formerly aired under the Newsroom banner before being relaunched as weekend editions of New Day in June 2013, are anchored by Victor Blackwell and Christi Paul. Fredricka Whitfield hosts the weekend daytime edition of Newsroom. The weekend afternoon/evening edition was originally hosted by Don Lemon (later Poppy Harlow and Ana Cabrera).

On August 12, 2013, CNN/U.S. rebranded the a portion of the broadcast of Newsroom as Legal View with Ashleigh Banfield. The 60-minute-long show based in New York focused on the most important legal news of the day, and aired its last episode on September 23, 2016.

From August 12, 2013 to February 7, 2014, Newsroom, with its reduced airtime, aired weekday mornings for two hours anchored by Carol Costello. Wolf Blitzer anchored the a later hour of the program with Brooke Baldwin until February 2014, when the slot was renamed as Wolf. The new show details the latest on politics, breaking news and international news, and was simulcast on CNN International. Wolf was cancelled on November 9, 2018.

On February 10, 2014, an hour of CNN Newsroom was renamed At This Hour with Berman and Michaela , hosted by John Berman and Michaela Pereira.

In November 2014, Poppy Harlow took over primetime anchoring duties on weekend evening editions of CNN Newsroom. The shift was covered by rotating anchors following Don Lemon's move to CNN Tonight in early 2014.

In February 2017, Carol Costello left CNN for HLN, and was succeeded by John Berman and Poppy Harlow. Ana Cabrera took over Harlow's weekend evening slot.

In May 2018, John Berman left the show to become the new co-anchor of New Day, the flagship morning program for CNN.

In September 2018, Jim Sciutto became the new co-anchor in CNN Newsroom on the show with Poppy Harlow.

CNN Newsroom currently has a duration of five hours with an hour of At This Hour with Kate Bolduan and an hour of Inside Politics  with John King in between the duration at 11 a.m. Eastern Time. Poppy Harlow and Jim Scuitto cover the 9–11am slot, while Ana Cabrera is at 1–2p and Alisyn Camerota and Victor Blackwell from 2–4p, all Eastern Times.

In January 2021, CNN announced Pamela Brown as the host of the 6 p.m. – 9 p.m. edition on weekends.

In February 2021, CNN announced a major change to its schedule. Brianna Keilar’s CNN Right Now program was cancelled and replaced by an hour of CNN Newsroom hosted by Ana Cabrera on the 1-2 p.m. slot while Alisyn Camerota and Victor Blackwell took the place of Brooke Baldwin (who left CNN in mid-April) on the 2–4 p.m. slot of CNN Newsroom.

In August 2021, Poppy Harlow announced she would be leaving CNN temporarily to attend a one year law school program. She continues to anchor the 9–11 a.m. slot on holidays, days off, or filling in for other anchors on other CNN programs including CNN Newsroom. She returned to her regular timeslot on May 30, 2022.

On December 15, 2022, it was confirmed that Ana Cabrera would be leaving CNN at the end of her 
1 p.m. ET program on December 22, and would be eyeing a new role at NBC News.

In January 2023, CNN announced plans to revamp its daytime programming with blocks hosted by teams of anchors, a more "energetic" format, and a focus on breaking news coverage. The 9 a.m.–Noon block of Newsroom will be replaced by a new program hosted by John Berman, Kate Bolduan and Sara Sidner, and the 1–4 p.m. block will be hosted by Brianna Keilar, Boris Sanchez and Jim Sciutto. Alisyn Camerota will move exclusively to CNN Tonight, while Victor Blackwell will move to Saturday mornings (co-hosting CNN This Morning Weekend, and anchoring an hour of Newsroom). On March 1, 2023, it was announced that the new lineups would launch in April, under the new title CNN News Central.

Notable personalities 
Programs occasionally pre-empted for special programs.

Current Anchors

Weekdays

Weekends

Weather team 
Chad Myers

Former Anchors

Awards 
In 2010, CNN Newsroom was nominated for a GLAAD Media Award for "Outstanding TV Journalism - Newsmagazine" for the episode "Gay Killings in Iraq" during the 21st GLAAD Media Awards. Also that year, it was nominated for "Outstanding TV Journalism Segment" for the segment "Lt. Col. Victor Fehrenbach 'I Was Utterly Devastated'".

Gaffes 
In September 2014, CNN technology analyst Brett Larson was criticized after incorrectly referring to the imageboard website 4chan as a person, suggesting it was “a systems administrator who knew his away around and how to hack things”. He had appeared on the program to explain the leak of nude celebrity photos from several hacked iCloud accounts.

In June 2015, a London gay pride parade included an ISIL parody flag, replacing the Arabic letters with dildos and butt plugs. Malveaux described the presence of an ISIS flag at a gay pride parade as "unnerving" before a seven-minute live cross to a CNN "terrorism expert" in London.

References

External links

 

CNN original programming
2006 American television series debuts
2000s American television news shows
2010s American television news shows
2020s American television news shows